Melissa Piperno (born February 6, 1984 in LaSalle, Quebec) is a Canadian ice dancer. With former partner Liam Dougherty, she is the 2003 Canadian junior national champion. They placed 10th at the 2003 World Junior Figure Skating Championships and competed on both the Junior Grand Prix and senior Grand Prix of Figure Skating. They began skating together in 1999 and their partnership ended in 2004.

Competitive highlights
(with Dougherty)

 N = Novice level; J = Junior level

References

 

1984 births
Canadian female ice dancers
Living people
People from LaSalle, Quebec
Figure skaters from Montreal